Harv (born 1985) is an American record producer. Harv may also refer to:

Harv., taxonomic author abbreviation of William Henry Harvey (1811–1866), Irish botanist 
Harvard University, private Ivy League research university founded in 1636 in Cambridge, Massachusetts
Harvard Law School, law school of Harvard University founded in 1817
Harvard Law Review, journal of the law school founded in 1887